Malta participated in the inaugural Paralympic Games in 1960 in Rome. The country sent four representatives (three men and a woman) to compete in athletics, snooker and table tennis. Each of them won a medal in his or her event. Malta won more medals than at any other edition of the Paralympic Games, and won its only silver medals to date; it would win bronze, at best, in subsequent Games.

Medallists

See also

Malta at the 1960 Summer Olympics

References

Nations at the 1960 Summer Paralympics
1960
Paralympics